The following lists events that happened in 1929 in Iceland.

Incumbents
Monarch - Kristján X
Prime Minister – Tryggvi Þórhallsson

Events

8 March – Litla-Hraun prison established
25 May – The Conservative Party merged with the Liberal Party to form the Independence Party
1929 Úrvalsdeild
The newspaper Ísafold merged with Morgunblaðið

Births
30 June – Atli Steinarsson, swimmer (d. 2017)
6 July – Högna Sigurðardóttir, architect (d. 2017)
12 October – Magnus Magnusson, journalist, translator, writer and television presenter (d. 2007)
11 November – Pálmi Jónsson, politician. (d. 2017)
12 November – Ríkharður Jónsson, footballer (d. 2017)

Deaths
12 November – Bogi Thorarensen Melsteð, historian and politician (b. 1860).

References

 
1920s in Iceland
Iceland
Iceland
Years of the 20th century in Iceland